The European Patent Judges' Symposium is a biennial symposium, with the claimed aim of providing a platform for national judges from legal systems with differing traditions to exchange experiences and to thereby promote mutual understanding in the development of European patent law.

Along with the Standing Advisory Committee before the European Patent Office (SACEPO), a committee advising the European Patent Office (EPO) on patent law issues, and the European Round Table on Patent Practice (EUROTAB), the European Patent Judges' Symposium is one of the most significant and institutionalised forums of legal professionals created and sponsored by the EPO.

List
 1st, 19–22 October 1982, Munich, Germany
 2nd, 5–7 September 1984, Strasbourg, France
 3rd, 3–5 September 1986, Vienna, Austria
 4th, 7–9 September 1988, Lausanne-Dorigny, Switzerland
 5th, 12–14 September 1990, Turin, Italy
 6th, 8–11 September 1992, The Hague, Netherlands
 7th, 6–9 September 1994, Newport, United Kingdom
 8th, 17–20 September 1996, Stockholm, Sweden
 9th, 6–9 October 1998, Madrid, Spain - Official Journal of the EPO (OJ EPO) 1999, Special edition
 10th, 19–23 September 2000, Mondorf-les-Bains, Luxembourg - OJ EPO 2001, Special edition (pdf)
 11th, 17–20 September 2002, Copenhagen, Denmark - OJ EPO 2003, Special edition No. 2 (pdf) 
 12th, 22–24 September 2004, Brussels, Belgium - OJ EPO, Special edition of the OJ EPO 2005 (pdf)
 13th, 12–16 September 2006, Thessaloniki, Greece - OJ EPO, Special edition 2/2007 (pdf)
 14th, 16–20 September 2008, Bordeaux, France  - OJ EPO, Special edition 1/2009 (pdf)
 15th, 15–17 September 2010, Lisbon, Portugal - OJ EPO Special edition 1/2011 (pdf)
 16th, 5–7 September 2012, Dublin, Ireland - OJ EPO Special edition 1/2013 (pdf)

References

External links
European Patent Judges' Symposium at the European Patent Office (EPO)

European Patent Organisation
Legal conferences
Biennial events